Bring 'Em Bach Alive! is the debut solo album by heavy metal singer Sebastian Bach, his first after his departure from Skid Row. It was released in November 1999. It is  mainly a live album composed of Skid Row songs of Bach's era; however it also includes five new studio recordings which are the first five tracks on the album including the single "Superjerk, Superstar, Supertears" and the promo single "Rock 'N' Roll".

Overview
The album charted at number 95 in Japan  and sold US: 16,979+ 

The song "The Most Powerful Man in the World" was originally released on the 1998 album The Last Hard Men from the band of the same name which was formed and fronted by Bach after he left Skid Row in 1996.

Track listings

Personnel
Studio tracks
Sebastian Bach – vocals
Wolf Hoffmann – guitar (track 1), background vocals
Richie Scarlet – guitar (tracks 2, 4, 5), harmonica (track 5), background vocals
Dave Linsk – guitar (track 2)
Jimmy Flemion – guitar (tracks 3, 4)
Larry Fisher – guitar (track 5), bass, background vocals
Anton Fig – drums

Live band
Sebastian Bach – vocals
Richie Scarlet – guitar, background vocals
Jimmy Flemion – guitar, background vocals
Larry Fisher – bass
Mark "Bambam" McConnell – drums

Production
Michael Wagener – producer, engineering, mixing
Sebastian Bach – producer
Todd Goldstein, Mike Nuceder – engineering
Eric Conn – mastering
David Bierk – art & design
Mark Weiss – photography
Wolf Hoffmann – photography

Charts

References

1999 live albums
Sebastian Bach albums
Spitfire Records live albums
Atlantic Records live albums
Albums produced by Michael Wagener
Albums recorded at Electric Lady Studios